Thomas Joseph Carmody (10 February 1880 – 23 May 1932) was an Australian rules footballer who played with Collingwood in the Victorian Football League (VFL).

References

External links

Tom Carmody's profile at Collingwood Forever

1880 births
1932 deaths
Australian rules footballers from Melbourne
Collingwood Football Club players
People from North Melbourne